The 2000–01 League of Ireland Premier Division was the 16th season of the League of Ireland Premier Division. The division was made up of 12 teams. Bohemians won the title.

Regular season
The season saw each team playing three rounds of games, playing every other team three times, totalling 33 games.

Final Table

Results

Matches 1–22

Matches 23–33

Promotion/relegation play-off
UCD who finished in tenth place played off against Athlone Town, the third placed team from the 2000–01 League of Ireland First Division.

1st Leg

2nd Leg 

UCD win 4-2 on penalties after extra time and retain their place in the Premier Division.

See also
 2000–01 League of Ireland First Division

References

Ireland
1
League of Ireland Premier Division seasons